Elegant Gypsy is the second album by American jazz fusion guitarist Al Di Meola. It was released in 1977 by Columbia Records.

Background
Elegant Gypsy was a follow-up album to Di Meola's debut release, Land of the Midnight Sun. The distinctive music on the album is a speedy fusion of jazz and rock, with lightning-fast guitar riffs intermixed with lyrical acoustical passages. The songs include explorations of Latin music themes, including acoustic genres like flamenco.

Elegant Gypsy won an annual award for Best Guitar Album in Guitar Player Magazine.

Track listing
All songs by Al Di Meola unless otherwise noted.

Personnel 
Al Di Meola – guitar, piano, synthesizer, percussion
Paco de Lucía – guitar
Jan Hammer – keyboards
Barry Miles – keyboards
Anthony Jackson – bass guitar
Steve Gadd – drums
Lenny White – drums
Mingo Lewis – congas, synthesizers, organ, percussion

Chart performance

References

1977 albums
Al Di Meola albums
Columbia Records albums